Forum 303 Mall was a shopping mall built at Pioneer Parkway (Spur 303) and SH 360 in Arlington, Texas in the Mid-Cities between Fort Worth and Dallas.  The  complex was dedicated September 19, 1970. Interesting features of it was that it included a public ice skating rink, and a public amphitheater in the lower level. During the 1970s many local and national acts, such as Roy Clark, performed there.

It was converted to an indoor bazaar/flea market venue and renamed Festival Marketplace in 1998, but that concept also failed.  Air-conditioner problems and competition with Six Flags Mall, The Parks at Arlington, and Traders Village contributed to its 2006 demise.

Demolition of it started in September 2007.  The site has been rebuilt as a business park called Pioneer 360 Business Center.

Former anchors
 Leonard's (acquired by Dillard's in March 1974) [239,000 square feet, with freestanding Auto Center]
 Dillard's (Converted to Dillard's Clearance Center)
 Dillard's Clearance Center (moved to Six Flags Mall in 2005)
 Montgomery Ward (closed 2001) [151,000 square feet, with freestanding Auto Center]
 Service Merchandise (closed 1999)
 AMC Theatres

See also 
Dead mall

References

External links
Some pictures of the Forum303 Demolition

Defunct shopping malls in the United States
Demolished shopping malls in the United States
Shopping malls established in 1970
Shopping malls disestablished in 2006
Shopping malls in the Dallas–Fort Worth metroplex
2006 disestablishments in Texas
Buildings and structures in Arlington, Texas
Buildings and structures demolished in 2007
1970 establishments in Texas